Velleius is a genus of beetles, belonging to the family Staphylinidae.

The genus was described in 1819 by William Elford Leach.

Species:
 Velleius dilatatus (Fabricius, 1787)

References

Staphylinidae